Clara Vázquez (born 27 April 1961) is a Puerto Rican softball player. She competed in the women's tournament at the 1996 Summer Olympics. As well as competing at the Olympics, Vázquez was part of Puerto Rico's team that won silver medals at the 1987 Pan American Games and the 1995 Pan American Games. In 2003, she was inducted into the World Baseball Softball Confederation's hall of fame.

References

External links
 

1961 births
Living people
Puerto Rican softball players
Olympic softball players of Puerto Rico
Softball players at the 1996 Summer Olympics
Place of birth missing (living people)